Srgjan Zaharievski or Srǵan Zaharievski (born 12 September 1973) is a Macedonian football manager and former player who played as a midfielder. He is the current manager of FC Struga.

Playing career

Club
Zaharievski began his career with FK Sileks. He once was on the books of German side VfB Stuttgart and also had a spell with S.C. Campomaiorense in the Portuguese Liga.

International
He made his senior debut for Macedonia in a March 1996 friendly match against Malta and has earned a total of 22 caps, scoring 3 goals. His final international was a March 2002 friendly against Bosnia & Herzegovina.

International goals

Managerial career
Zaharievski was appointed coach of Pelister Bitola in summer 2017.

Honours and awards
FK Sileks Kratovo
Macedonian First League: 2
Winner: 1996, 1997
Macedonian Cup: 2
Winner: 1994, 1997
VfB Stuttgart II
Oberliga Baden-Württemberg: 1
Winner: 1998
Württemberg Cup: 1
Winner: 2000
FK Vardar Skopje
Macedonian First League: 2
Winner: 2002, 2003
FK Teteks Tetovo
Macedonian Cup: 1
Winner: 2010

References

External links

1973 births
Living people
Footballers from Skopje
Association football midfielders
Macedonian footballers
North Macedonia international footballers
FK Sileks players
VfB Stuttgart II players
S.C. Campomaiorense players
FK Vardar players
Doxa Drama F.C. players
Rodos F.C. players
Anagennisi Karditsa F.C. players
FK Teteks players
FK Metalurg Skopje players
Macedonian First Football League players
Primeira Liga players
Gamma Ethniki players
Football League (Greece) players
Macedonian expatriate footballers
Expatriate footballers in Germany
Macedonian expatriate sportspeople in Germany
Expatriate footballers in Portugal
Macedonian expatriate sportspeople in Portugal
Expatriate footballers in Greece
Macedonian expatriate sportspeople in Greece
Macedonian football managers
FK Metalurg Skopje managers
FK Pelister managers